Kalateh-ye Sohrab or Kalateh Sohrab may refer to:
 Kalateh-ye Sohrab, North Khorasan
 Kalateh-ye Sohrab, Sistan and Baluchestan